Le Couteur Glacier is a glacier,  long, which drains the northwest slopes of Mount Hall and Mount Daniel and flows north along the west side of the Lillie Range to the Ross Ice Shelf, Antarctica. It was named by the Southern Party of the New Zealand Geological Survey Antarctic Expedition (1963–64) for P. C. Le Couteur, a geologist with the New Zealand Federated Mountain Clubs Antarctic Expedition, 1962–63.

References

Glaciers of Dufek Coast